Marie of Romania (1875–1938) was Queen of Romania, wife of King Ferdinand I and grandmother of King Michael I

Marie of Romania or Maria of Romania may also refer to:
 Princess Maria of Romania (1870–1874), daughter of King Carol I
 Maria of Yugoslavia (1900–1961), queen of Yugoslavia and daughter of King Ferdinand I of Romania
 Princess Marie of Romania (born 1964), daughter of King Michael I